Dichomeris pammiges is a moth in the family Gelechiidae. It was described by Jean Ghesquière in 1940. It is found in the former Équateur province in the Democratic Republic of the Congo.

References

Moths described in 1940
pammiges
Endemic fauna of the Democratic Republic of the Congo